Robert Helmer MacArthur (April 7, 1930 – November 1, 1972) was a Canadian-born American ecologist who made a major impact on many areas of community and population ecology. He is considered a founder of evolutionary biology.

Early life and education 
MacArthur was born in Toronto, Ontario, to John Wood MacArthur and Olive Turner in 1930. He later moved to Marlboro, Vermont, as his father moved from the 
University of Toronto to Marlboro College.  MacArthur received his Bachelor's degree in mathematics from Marlboro College, followed by a Master's degree in mathematics from Brown University in 1953. A student of G. Evelyn Hutchinson, MacArthur earned his Ph.D. from Yale University in 1957; his thesis was on the division of ecological niches among five warbler species in the conifer forests of Maine and Vermont. From 1957 to 1958, MacArthur worked as a postdoc with David Lack.

Career 
MacArthur was a professor at the University of Pennsylvania, 1958–65, and professor of biology at Princeton University, 1965-72. He played an important role in the development of niche partitioning, and with E.O. Wilson he co-authored The Theory of Island Biogeography (1967), a work which changed the field of biogeography, drove community ecology and led to the development of modern landscape ecology.  His emphasis on hypothesis testing helped change ecology from a primarily descriptive field into an experimental field, and drove the development of theoretical ecology.

At Princeton, MacArthur served as the general editor of the series Monographs in Population Biology, and helped to found the journal Theoretical Population Biology. He also wrote Geographical Ecology: Patterns in the Distribution of Species (1972). He was elected to the National Academy of Sciences in 1969. Robert MacArthur died of renal cancer in 1972.

See also
 Island biogeography
 Optimal foraging theory
 Robert H. MacArthur Award

References

External links
 Bibliography of Robert H. MacArthur

1930 births
1972 deaths
American ecologists
Brown University alumni
Marlboro College alumni
Mathematical ecologists
Members of the United States National Academy of Sciences
People from Toronto
Princeton University faculty
University of Pennsylvania faculty
Yale University alumni